China Coal Energy Co., Ltd. (Chinese: 中国中煤能源股份公司英文站; pinyin: zhōngguó zhōng méi néngyuán gǔfèn gōngsī yīngwén zhàn), is a publicly traded company  listed on the Hong Kong Stock Exchange and the Shanghai Stock Exchange. It is involved in mining coal and processing coal products. 

Since 2021, Wang Shudong serves as the company's chairman.

On 16 December 2006, it was listed in the Hong Kong Stock Exchange as H share.  China Coal joined Hang Seng China Enterprises Index Constitute Stock. On 7 September 2007, China Coal announced that it would issue A-share in the Shanghai Stock Exchange. It was listed in the Shanghai Stock Exchange in February 2008.

See also

Coal power in China

References

External links

Companies formerly in the Hang Seng China Enterprises Index
Companies listed on the Shanghai Stock Exchange
Companies listed on the Hong Kong Stock Exchange
Coal companies of China
Government-owned companies of China
Non-renewable resource companies established in 1999
Non-renewable resource companies established in 2006
Former companies in the Hang Seng Index
H shares
Chinese companies established in 1999